Ahmad Fadzli bin Hashim is a Malaysian politician and currently serves as Deputy Speaker of the Kedah State Legislative Assembly.

Election Results

References 

Living people
People from Kedah
Malaysian people of Malay descent
Malaysian Muslims
Malaysian Islamic Party politicians
21st-century Malaysian politicians
Year of birth missing (living people)
Al-Azhar University alumni
Malaysian expatriates in Egypt